Héctor Moretti (born 27 January 1973) is a former professional tennis player from Argentina.

Career
Moretti's only Grand Slam appearance was in the 1999 French Open, which he qualified for with wins over Dirk Dier, Oscar Serrano and Mikael Tillström. In the first round he played 16th seed Thomas Enqvist, who beat him in four sets.

He took part in both the singles and doubles at the 2000 Austrian Open. Puerto Rican José Frontera partnered him in the doubles and they were defeated in the opening round by Adrián García and Fabio Maggi. The Argentine didn't fare any better in the singles, losing his only match to Agustín Calleri.

Challenger titles

Singles: (1)

References

1973 births
Living people
Argentine male tennis players
Tennis players from Buenos Aires